Staunton State Park is a Colorado state park in Park and Jefferson counties, located  west of Conifer, Colorado. The  park, which opened on May 18, 2013,  includes dramatic rock outcroppings, several streams and a waterfall.  On December 4, 2012, the property was also listed on the National Register of Historic Places as Staunton Ranch-Rural Historic Landscape.

The park was created out of a gift by Frances H. Staunton, who donated the original 1,720 acres to the State of Colorado. Ms. Staunton required the land "be preserved in perpetuity, for public benefit, as a natural wilderness-type park... typifying Colorado's most beautiful mountain forest and meadow region". Since 1986, the State of Colorado acquired additional lands through the Great Outdoors Colorado (GOCO) lottery proceeds. These include the Elk Falls Ranch, portions of the Davis Ranch, and property once owned by playwright Mary Coyle Chase. The Staunton Ranch was added to the National Register of Historic Places for exemplifying a pattern of homesteading, ranching, and use as a summer resort. It is also considered notable for its rustic architecture and for containing the area's only sawmill.

The park's recreational offerings include rock climbing, multi-use trails for hiking, biking, and horseback riding, stream and pond fishing, and picnicking.

References

External links
 Staunton State Park Colorado Parks & Wildlife
 Friends of Staunton State Park

2013 establishments in Colorado
National Register of Historic Places in Park County, Colorado
Protected areas of Jefferson County, Colorado
Protected areas of Park County, Colorado
Ranches on the National Register of Historic Places in Colorado
State parks of Colorado